Rima Zeidan (born May 1, 1990) is a Taiwanese-Lebanese presenter, model and actress from Taiwan. In 2017 she appeared in the film Missing Johnny for which she was voted Best New Talent at the Taipei Film Festival and won the Golden Horse Award for Best New Performer.

Life and career
Zeidan was born in 1990 in Taiwan to a Taiwanese mother and a Lebanese father. She entered showbiz at the age of sixteen, appearing in over 100 television adverts and hosting Taiwanese tourism programs. In 2009 at the age of 18, while in the United States on a study trip she was involved in a motorcycle accident which killed her boyfriend and left her with third degree burns on over 30% of her body. After recovering, she returned to the industry to become the face of skincare companies and hosted on various travel programs.

In 2017 Zeidan made her film debut in the Taiwanese movie Missing Johnny in which she played the role of a woman named Hsu Zi-qi. Zeidan's performance in the film was widely praised leading to her being nominated for best actress awards at the 54th Golden Horse Awards, the Taipei Film Awards and the Shanghai International Film Festival.

References

External links
 

Living people
1990 births
Taiwanese film actresses
Taiwanese television presenters
Taiwanese people of Lebanese descent
Taiwanese female models
21st-century Taiwanese actresses
Taiwanese women television presenters